Hartley Pit railway station served the village of Hartley, Northumberland, North East England from 1847 to 1851 on what is now known as the Northumberland Line.

History 
The station opened on 3 May 1847 by the Blyth, Seghill & Percy Main Railway, predecessor of the Blyth and Tyne Railway. The station is thought to have been situated south of St Michael's Avenue at the east end of New Hartley's built-up area. The exact site of the station is not known, but it is though to have been located close to Hartley Colliery, which would later be the site of the notorious Hartley Colliery Disaster occurred on 16 January 1862.

References

External links 

Disused railway stations in Northumberland
Former North Eastern Railway (UK) stations
Railway stations in Great Britain opened in 1847
Railway stations in Great Britain closed in 1851
1847 establishments in England
1851 disestablishments in England